Asnoti railway station is a station on Konkan Railway. It is at a distance of  down from origin. Asnoti railway station lies on the north bank of river Kali. The preceding station on the line is Loliem railway station and the next station is Karwar railway station.

References 

Railway stations along Konkan Railway line
Railway stations in Uttara Kannada district
Karwar railway division